Philippines campaign may refer to various military campaigns that have been fought in the Philippine Islands, including:

Spanish colonial period (1565–1898)
Numerous revolts against Spain during the Spanish colonial period; see Philippine revolts against Spain and Military history of the Philippines#Spanish colonial period (1565–1898)
Various actions fought in the Philippines during the Eighty Years' War between Spain and the Netherlands; see "Eighty Years War (1568–1648)" at Military history of the Philippines#Spanish colonial period (1565–1898)
The Limahong Campaign (1573–1575), an attempt by the Chinese pirate Limahong to seize northern Luzon from Spanish authorities
Various actions fought in the Philippines during the Seven Years War (1756–1763) between European powers; see Military history of the Philippines#Spanish colonial period (1565–1898) and Seven Years' War#Other Continents
The Philippine Revolution (1896–1898), called the "Tagalog Revolt" by the Spanish, a military conflict between the people of the Philippines and the Spanish colonial authorities which resulted in the secession of the Philippines from the Spanish Empire

American colonial period (1898–1941)
The American operations of May–August 1898 to conquer the Philippines from Spain during the Spanish–American War; see "Philippines" under "Pacific" at Spanish–American War#Theaters of operation
The Philippine–American War (1899–1902), sometimes known as the Philippine War of Independence, an armed military conflict between the Philippines and the United States
The Moro Rebellion (1899–1913), a military conflict between Muslim Filipino revolutionary groups and the United States

World War II (1941–1945) and the Japanese occupation (1942–1945)
The Philippines campaign (1941–42), the World War II conquest of the Philippine Islands by Japan in 1941–1942 and the defense of the islands by Filipino and American forces
The Philippine Commonwealth military and armed guerrilla resistance against occupying Japanese forces between 1942 and 1945 during World War II; see Japanese occupation of the Philippines
The Philippines campaign (1944–45), the World War II Allied campaign of October 1944 – August 1945 to defeat Japanese forces occupying the Philippine Islands

Non-military uses
Philippines campaign may also refer to:

The Campaign for Human Rights in the Philippines, a human rights watchdog group based in the United Kingdom

See also
Military history of the Philippines
Philippine Campaign Medal
Philippines campaign medals

Military history of the Philippines